Christoper Haines  (born 1944) is an historical reenactor and the founder of the Ermine Street Guard in 1972.

Life and career 
Haines was originally a farmer in his native Gloucestershire. In 1972, he was asked to take part in a pageant at St Mary's Church in Great Witcombe, Gloucestershire. He formed a group for the occasion, and he went on to establish it as the Ermine Street Guard shortly thereafter. As of 2007, it had sixty members. He is now its chairman, in addition to his role as the Guards' centurion Lucius Flavius Aper, of the Legio II Augusta.

Haines was awarded an MBE in 2007, at the age of 63.

References

External links
On the Edge of an Empire | FULL EPISODE | Time Team, Time Team Classics, YouTube, 20 September 2019

1944 births
Living people
Historical reenactment
People from Gloucestershire
Members of the Order of the British Empire